The 2023 Tampa Bay Rays season will be the 26th season of the Tampa Bay Rays franchise and their 16th as the Rays. The Rays play their home games at Tropicana Field as members of Major League Baseball's American League East Division.

Offseason

Rule changes 
Pursuant to the CBA, new rule changes will be in place for the 2023 season:

 institution of a pitch clock between pitches;
 limits on pickoff attempts per plate appearance;
 limits on defensive shifts requiring two infielders to be on either side of second and be within the boundary of the infield; and
 larger bases (increased to 18-inch squares);

Regular season

Game log

|- style="background: 
| 1 || March 30 || Tigers || – || || || — || || – || 
|- style="background: 
| 2 || April 1 || Tigers || – || || || — || || – ||
|- style="background: 
| 3 || April 2 || Tigers || – || || || — || || – ||
|- style="background: 
| 4 || April 3 || @ Nationals || – || || || — || || – ||
|- style="background: 
| 5 || April 4 || @ Nationals || – || || || — || || – ||
|- style="background: 
| 6 || April 5 || @ Nationals || – || || || — || || – ||
|- style="background: 
| 7 || April 7 || Athletics || – || || || — || || – ||
|- style="background: 
| 8 || April 8 || Athletics || – || || || — || || – ||
|- style="background: 
| 9 || April 9 || Athletics || – || || || — || || – ||
|- style="background: 
| 10 || April 10 || Red Sox || – || || || — || || – ||
|- style="background: 
| 11 || April 11 || Red Sox || – || || || — || || – ||
|- style="background: 
| 12 || April 12 || Red Sox || – || || || — || || – ||
|- style="background: 
| 13 || April 13 || Red Sox || – || || || — || || – ||
|- style="background: 
| 14 || April 14 || @ Blue Jays || – || || || — || || – ||
|- style="background: 
| 15 || April 15 || @ Blue Jays || – || || || — || || – ||
|- style="background: 
| 16 || April 16 || @ Blue Jays || – || || || — || || – ||
|- style="background: 
| 17 || April 17 || @ Reds || – || || || — || || – ||
|- style="background: 
| 18 || April 18 || @ Reds || – || || || — || || – ||
|- style="background: 
| 19 || April 19 || @ Reds || – || || || — || || – ||
|- style="background: 
| 20 || April 21 || White Sox || – || || || — || || – ||
|- style="background: 
| 21 || April 22 || White Sox || – || || || — || || – ||
|- style="background: 
| 22 || April 23 || White Sox || – || || || — || || – ||
|- style="background: 
| 23 || April 24 || Astros || – || || || — || || – ||
|- style="background: 
| 24 || April 25 || Astros || – || || || — || || – ||
|- style="background: 
| 25 || April 26 || Astros || – || || || — || || – ||
|- style="background: 
| 26 || April 27 || @ White Sox || – || || || — || || – ||
|- style="background: 
| 27 || April 28 || @ White Sox || – || || || — || || – ||
|- style="background: 
| 28 || April 29 || @ White Sox || – || || || — || || – ||
|- style="background: 
| 29 || April 30 || @ White Sox || – || || || — || || – ||
|- 
 

|- style="background: 
| 30 || May 2 || Pirates || – || || || — || || – ||
|- style="background: 
| 31 || May 3 || Pirates || – || || || — || || – ||
|- style="background: 
| 32 || May 4 || Pirates || – || || || — || || – ||
|- style="background: 
| 33 || May 5 || Yankees || – || || || — || || – ||
|- style="background: 
| 34 || May 6 || Yankees || – || || || — || || – ||
|- style="background: 
| 35 || May 7 || Yankees || – || || || — || || – ||
|- style="background: 
| 36 || May 8 || @ Orioles || – || || || — || || – ||
|- style="background: 
| 37 || May 9 || @ Orioles || – || || || — || || – ||
|- style="background: 
| 38 || May 10 || @ Orioles || – || || || — || || – ||
|- style="background: 
| 39 || May 11 || @ Yankees || – || || || — || || – ||
|- style="background: 
| 40 || May 12 || @ Yankees || – || || || — || || – ||
|- style="background: 
| 41 || May 13 || @ Yankees || – || || || — || || – ||
|- style="background: 
| 42 || May 14 || @ Yankees || – || || || — || || – ||
|- style="background: 
| 43 || May 16 || @ Mets || – || || || — || || – ||
|- style="background: 
| 44 || May 17 || @ Mets || – || || || — || || – ||
|- style="background: 
| 45 || May 18 || @ Mets || – || || || — || || – ||
|- style="background:
| 46 || May 19 || Brewers || – || || || — || || – ||
|- style="background:
| 47 || May 20 || Brewers || – || || || — || || – ||
|- style="background:
| 48 || May 21 || Brewers || – || || || — || || – ||
|- style="background: 
| 49 || May 22 || Blue Jays || – || || || — || || – ||
|- style="background: 
| 50 || May 23 || Blue Jays || – || || || — || || – ||
|- style="background: 
| 51 || May 24 || Blue Jays || – || || || — || || – ||
|- style="background: 
| 52 || May 25 || Blue Jays || – || || || — || || – ||
|- style="background: 
| 53 || May 26 || Dodgers || – || || || — || || – ||
|- style="background: 
| 54 || May 27 || Dodgers || – || || || — || || – ||
|- style="background: 
| 55 || May 28 || Dodgers || – || || || — || || – ||
|- style="background: 
| 56 || May 29 || @ Cubs || – || || || — || || – ||
|- style="background: 
| 57 || May 30 || @ Cubs || – || || || — || || – ||
|- style="background: 
| 58 || May 31 || @ Cubs || – || || || — || || – ||
|- 
 

|- style="background: 
| 59 || June 2 || @ Red Sox || – || || || — || || – ||
|- style="background: 
| 60 || June 3 || @ Red Sox || – || || || — || || – ||
|- style="background: 
| 61 || June 4 || @ Red Sox || – || || || — || || – ||
|- style="background: 
| 62 || June 5 || @ Red Sox || – || || || — || || – ||
|- style="background: 
| 63 || June 6 || Twins || – || || || — || || – ||
|- style="background: 
| 64 || June 7 || Twins || – || || || — || || – ||
|- style="background: 
| 65 || June 8 || Twins || – || || || — || || – ||
|- style="background: 
| 66 || June 9 || Rangers || – || || || — || || – ||
|- style="background: 
| 67 || June 10 || Rangers || – || || || — || || – ||
|- style="background: 
| 68 || June 11 || Rangers || – || || || — || || – ||
|- style="background: 
| 69 || June 12 || @ Athletics || – || || || — || || – ||
|- style="background: 
| 70 || June 13 || @ Athletics || – || || || — || || – ||
|- style="background: 
| 71 || June 14 || @ Athletics || – || || || — || || – ||
|- style="background: 
| 72 || June 15 || @ Athletics || – || || || — || || – ||
|- style="background: 
| 73 || June 16 || @ Padres || – || || || — || || – ||
|- style="background: 
| 74 || June 17 || @ Padres || – || || || — || || – ||
|- style="background: 
| 75 || June 18 || @ Padres || – || || || — || || – ||
|- style="background: 
| 76 || June 20 || Orioles || – || || || — || || – ||
|- style="background: 
| 77 || June 21 || Orioles || – || || || — || || – ||
|- style="background: 
| 78 || June 22 || Royals || – || || || — || || – ||
|- style="background: 
| 79 || June 23 || Royals || – || || || — || || – ||
|- style="background: 
| 80 || June 24 || Royals || – || || || — || || – ||
|- style="background: 
| 81 || June 25 || Royals || – || || || — || || – ||
|- style="background: 
| 82 || June 27 || @ Diamondbacks || – || || || — || || – ||
|- style="background: 
| 83 || June 28 || @ Diamondbacks || – || || || — || || – ||
|- style="background: 
| 84 || June 29 || @ Diamondbacks || – || || || — || || – ||
|- style="background: 
| 85 || June 30 || @ Mariners || – || || || — || || – ||
|- 
 

|- style="background: 
| 86 || July 1 || @ Mariners || – || || || — || || – ||
|- style="background: 
| 87 || July 2 || @ Mariners || – || || || — || || – ||
|- style="background: 
| 88 || July 4 || Phillies || – || || || — || || – ||
|- style="background: 
| 89 || July 5 || Phillies || – || || || — || || – ||
|- style="background: 
| 90 || July 6 || Phillies || – || || || — || || – ||
|- style="background: 
| 91 || July 7 || Braves || – || || || — || || – ||
|- style="background: 
| 92 || July 8 || Braves || – || || || — || || – ||
|- style="background: 
| 93 || July 9 || Braves || – || || || — || || – ||
|- style="text-align:center; background:#bbcaff;"
| colspan="10" | 93rd All-Star Game in Seattle
|- style="background: 
| 94 || July 14 || @ Royals || – || || || — || || – ||
|- style="background: 
| 95 || July 15 || @ Royals || – || || || — || || – ||
|- style="background: 
| 96 || July 16 || @ Royals || – || || || — || || – ||
|- style="background: 
| 97 || July 17 || @ Rangers || – || || || — || || – ||
|- style="background: 
| 98 || July 18 || @ Rangers || – || || || — || || – ||
|- style="background: 
| 99 || July 19 || @ Rangers || – || || || — || || – ||
|- style="background: 
| 100 || July 20 || Orioles || – || || || — || || – ||
|- style="background: 
| 101 || July 21 || Orioles || – || || || — || || – ||
|- style="background: 
| 102 || July 22 || Orioles || – || || || — || || – ||
|- style="background: 
| 103 || July 23 || Orioles || – || || || — || || – ||
|- style="background: 
| 104 || July 25 || Marlins || – || || || — || || – ||
|- style="background: 
| 105 || July 26 || Marlins || – || || || — || || – ||
|- style="background: 
| 106 || July 28 || @ Astros || – || || || — || || – ||
|- style="background: 
| 107 || July 29 || @ Astros || – || || || — || || – ||
|- style="background: 
| 108 || July 30 || @ Astros || – || || || — || || – ||
|- style="background: 
| 109 || July 31 || @ Yankees || – || || || — || || – ||
|- 
 

|- style="background: 
| 110 || August 1 || @ Yankees || – || || || — || || – ||
|- style="background: 
| 111 || August 2 || @ Yankees || – || || || — || || – ||
|- style="background: 
| 112 || August 4 || @ Tigers || – || || || — || || – ||
|- style="background: 
| 113 || August 5 || @ Tigers || – || || || — || || – ||
|- style="background: 
| 114 || August 6 || @ Tigers || – || || || — || || – ||
|- style="background: 
| 115 || August 8 || Cardinals || – || || || — || || – ||
|- style="background: 
| 116 || August 9 || Cardinals || – || || || — || || – ||
|- style="background: 
| 117 || August 10 || Cardinals || – || || || — || || – ||
|- style="background: 
| 118 || August 11 || Guardians || – || || || — || || – ||
|- style="background: 
| 119 || August 12 || Guardians || – || || || — || || – ||
|- style="background: 
| 120 || August 13 || Guardians || – || || || — || || – ||
|- style="background: 
| 121 || August 14 || @ Giants || – || || || — || || – ||
|- style="background: 
| 122 || August 15 || @ Giants || – || || || — || || – ||
|- style="background: 
| 123 || August 16 || @ Giants || – || || || — || || – ||
|- style="background: 
| 124 || August 18 || @ Angels || – || || || — || || – ||
|- style="background: 
| 125 || August 19 || @ Angels || – || || || — || || – ||
|- style="background: 
| 126 || August 20 || @ Angels || – || || || — || || – ||
|- style="background: 
| 127 || August 22 || Rockies || – || || || — || || – ||
|- style="background: 
| 128 || August 23 || Rockies || – || || || — || || – ||
|- style="background: 
| 129 || August 24 || Rockies || – || || || — || || – ||
|- style="background: 
| 130 || August 25 || Yankees || – || || || — || || – ||
|- style="background: 
| 131 || August 26 || Yankees || – || || || — || || – ||
|- style="background: 
| 132 || August 27 || Yankees || – || || || — || || – ||
|- style="background: 
| 133 || August 29 || @ Marlins || – || || || — || || – ||
|- style="background: 
| 134 || August 30 || @ Marlins || – || || || — || || – ||
|- 
 

|- style="background: 
| 135 || September 1 || @ Guardians || – || || || — || || – ||
|- style="background: 
| 136 || September 2 || @ Guardians || – || || || — || || – ||
|- style="background: 
| 137 || September 3 || @ Guardians || – || || || — || || – ||
|- style="background: 
| 138 || September 4 || Red Sox || – || || || — || || – ||
|- style="background: 
| 139 || September 5 || Red Sox || – || || || — || || – ||
|- style="background: 
| 140 || September 6 || Red Sox || – || || || — || || – ||
|- style="background: 
| 141 || September 7 || Mariners || – || || || — || || – ||
|- style="background: 
| 142 || September 8 || Mariners || – || || || — || || – ||
|- style="background: 
| 143 || September 9 || Mariners || – || || || — || || – ||
|- style="background: 
| 144 || September 10 || Mariners || – || || || — || || – ||
|- style="background: 
| 145 || September 11 || @ Twins || – || || || — || || – ||
|- style="background: 
| 146 || September 12 || @ Twins || – || || || — || || – ||
|- style="background: 
| 147 || September 13 || @ Twins || – || || || — || || – ||
|- style="background: 
| 148 || September 14 || @ Orioles || – || || || — || || – ||
|- style="background: 
| 149 || September 15 || @ Orioles || – || || || — || || – ||
|- style="background: 
| 150 || September 16 || @ Orioles || – || || || — || || – ||
|- style="background: 
| 151 || September 17 || @ Orioles || – || || || — || || – ||
|- style="background: 
| 152 || September 19 || Angels || – || || || — || || – ||
|- style="background: 
| 153 || September 20 || Angels || – || || || — || || – ||
|- style="background: 
| 154 || September 21 || Angels || – || || || — || || – ||
|- style="background: 
| 155 || September 22 || Blue Jays || – || || || — || || – ||
|- style="background: 
| 156 || September 23 || Blue Jays || – || || || — || || – ||
|- style="background: 
| 157 || September 24 || Blue Jays || – || || || — || || – ||
|- style="background: 
| 158 || September 26 || @ Red Sox || – || || || — || || – ||
|- style="background: 
| 159 || September 27 || @ Red Sox || – || || || — || || – ||
|- style="background: 
| 160 || September 29 || @ Blue Jays || – || || || — || || – ||
|- style="background: 
| 161 || September 30 || @ Blue Jays || – || || || — || || – ||
|- style="background: 
| 162 || October 1 || @ Blue Jays || – || || || — || || – ||
|-

Season standings

American League East

American League Wild Card

Current roster

Farm system

References

External links
Tampa Bay Rays 2023 Schedule at MLB.com
2023 Tampa Bay Rays season at ESPN
2023 Tampa Bay Rays season at Baseball Reference

Tampa Bay Rays season
Tampa Bay Rays
Tampa Bay Rays seasons